T. R. Viswanathan is an American engineer, who is currently the Silicon Laboratories Endowed Chair in Electrical Engineering at the Cockrell School of Engineering, University of Texas at Austin. He is formerly the Dean of the Indian Institute of Technology.
https://www.ece.utexas.edu/people/faculty/emeritus

References

Year of birth missing (living people)
Living people
University of Texas at Austin faculty
21st-century American engineers
Fellow Members of the IEEE
University of Michigan faculty
Academic staff of the University of Waterloo
University of Madras alumni
University of Saskatchewan alumni